Rhodina is a genus of moths of the family Erebidae. The genus was erected by Achille Guenée in 1854.

Species
 Rhodina falculalis Guenée, 1854
 Rhodina hyporrhoda (Turner, 1902)

References

Calpinae
Moth genera